Bulimulus amastroides is a species of land snail in the family Bulimulidae. It is endemic to the Galápagos Islands.

References

Bulimulus
Endemic gastropods of the Galápagos Islands
Taxonomy articles created by Polbot